String Quartet No. 18 may refer to:

 String Quartet No. 18 (Milhaud), Op. 308, by Darius Milhaud
 String Quartet No. 18 (Mozart) by Wolfgang Amadeus Mozart
 String Quartet No. 18 (Spohr) by Louis Spohr